Lunch. Drunk. Love is the ninth studio album by American rock band Bowling for Soup, released on September 10, 2013, through Brando Records and Que-so.  The album was completely fan-funded, as well as being released on the band's own record label like their previous album.  The band has released music videos for the songs "Real", "Right About Now", "Envy" and "Circle". "Circle" is also the first single off this record. The album charted at number 142 on the Billboard 200.

Background
In an interview with Distorted Sound, Reddick stated "Lunch.Drunk.Love. people refer to as my divorce record and it was pretty angry, and there’s just a lot of emotions on there that you’re not used to hearing from Bowling For Soup."

Production and recording

Within 48 hours 500 pledges were received  and in less than 7 days Reddick announced "Dude, you guys killed it...In less than 7 days, you guys made this all happen!!! Could not be happier, and more excited..." As the goal was reached Reddick gave pledgers a video of an early acoustic version of the song "Since We Broke Up". Chandler finished recording bass on May 10, 2013. It was announced that on day 10 in the recording studio the drums are done. Tracking and recording at the Daycare was officially wrapped up in May and that the songs will be sent to mixing. On June 11, 2013 Pledgers received an update regarding the album's title and that they would get to vote on what the album should be named. June 20, 2013 the band released the official title and cover for the new album. July 15 the album was sent to be mastered. More artwork was released in August along with lyric videos for "Envy", "Rooftops", "Real", and "Right About Now". Videos for "I am Waking Up Today", "Since We Broke Up", and  Circle" were released throughout September. The campaign closed on September 4, 2013 with attaining 3579 pledges and a  finished goal of 249%.

Track listing

B-sides

Personnel

 Jaret Reddick — Lead Vocals, rhythm guitar.
 Erik Chandler — bass guitar, Vocals
 Chris Burney — lead guitar, Vocals
 Gary Wiseman — Drums
Production
 Produced by: Jarinus (Linus of Hollywood & Jaret Reddick)
 Engineered by: Erik Herbst and Linus of Hollywood
 Mixed by: Jay Ruston at TRS West, Sherman Oaks, CA
 Additional mix engineers: James Ingram and Jared Scott
 Assisted by: Spike
 Mastered by: Paul Logus at Taloowa

Additional Musicians
 Linus of Hollywood
 Scott Simons
 Peter Adams
 Vincent Tyler
 Linda Stephens

References

External links

 
Lunch.Drunk.Love (Official Campaign)
Lunch. Drunk. Love. at YouTube (streamed copy where licensed)

2013 albums
Bowling for Soup albums